The Usno River is a tributary of the Omo River in Ethiopia. Almost all of the Usno's course is inside the boundaries of the Mago National Park.

See also
List of Ethiopian rivers

Omo River (Ethiopia)
Rivers of Ethiopia
Southern Nations, Nationalities, and Peoples' Region